Mariscal Benavides District (Spanish mariscal marshal) is one of twelve districts of the province Rodríguez de Mendoza in Peru.

References

Districts of the Rodríguez de Mendoza Province
Districts of the Amazonas Region